The men's high jump event  at the 1989 IAAF World Indoor Championships was held at the Budapest Sportcsarnok in Budapest on 3 and 4 March.

Medallists

Results

Qualification
Qualification: 2.23 metres (Q) or the best 12 (q) qualified for the final

Final

References

High jump
High jump at the World Athletics Indoor Championships